Martha Dandridge Custis Washington (June 2, 1731 — May 22, 1802) was the wife of George Washington, the first president of the United States. Although the title was not coined until after her death, she served as the inaugural first lady of the United States, defining the role of the president's wife and setting many precedents that future first ladies would observe. During her tenure, she was referred to as "Lady Washington". Washington is consistently ranked in the upper half of first ladies by historians.

Martha Dandridge first married Daniel Parke Custis in 1750, and the couple had four children, two of whom survived to adulthood. She was widowed in 1757 at the age of 26, inheriting a large estate. She was remarried to George Washington in 1759, moving to his plantation, Mount Vernon. Her youngest daughter died of epilepsy in 1773, and the Washingtons were unable to conceive any children of their own. Washington became a symbol of the American Revolution after her husband was appointed commander-in-chief of the Continental Army, and she took on a matronly role while visiting encampments when fighting stalled each winter. Her only surviving child, John, died from a camp illness during the war. After the war ended in 1783, Washington sought retirement at Mount Vernon, but she was returned to public life when her husband became president of the United States in 1789.

Washington took on the social role of the president's wife reluctantly, becoming a national celebrity in the process. She found this life unpleasant, feeling that she was restricted and wishing for retirement. In addition to hosting weekly social events, Washington understood that how she composed herself would reflect on the nation, both domestically and abroad. As such, she struck a careful balance between the dignity associated with a head of state's wife and the humility associated with republican government. The Washingtons returned to Mount Vernon in 1797, and she spent her retirement years greeting admirers and advising her successors. She was widowed for a second time in 1799, and she died two and a half years later in 1802.

Early life

Martha Dandridge was born on June 2, 1731, on her parents' plantation Chestnut Grove in the Colony of Virginia. She was the oldest daughter of John Dandridge, a Virginia planter and immigrant from England, and Frances Jones, the granddaughter of an Anglican rector. Her father was also a county clerk. Martha had three brothers and four sisters: John (1733–1749), William (1734–1776), Bartholomew (1737–1785), Anna Maria "Fanny" Bassett (1739–1777), Frances Dandridge (1744–1757), Elizabeth Aylett Henley (1749–1800), and Mary Dandridge (1756–1763). As the oldest of eight, including one sister that was 25 years her junior, Dandridge played a maternal and domestic role beginning early in life. 

Dandridge may have had an illegitimate half-sister, Ann Dandridge Costin, who was born into slavery. Costin's enslaved mother was of African and Cherokee descent, and her father was believed to be John Dandridge. She may have also had an illegitimate half-brother named Ralph Dandridge, who was most likely white.

Dandridge's father was well-connected with the Virginia aristocracy despite his relative lack of wealth, and she was taught to behave as a woman of the upper class. She received a relatively high quality education for the daughter of a planter, though it was still inferior to that of her brothers. She took to equestrianism, at one point riding her horse up and down the stairs of her uncle's home and escaping chastisement because her father was so impressed by her skill.

Marriage to Daniel Parke Custis

In 1749, Dandridge met Daniel Parke Custis, the son of a wealthy planter in Virginia. They wished to marry, but the father of Dandridge's prospective groom, John Custis, was highly selective of what woman would marry into the family's fortune. She eventually won his approval, and Dandridge married Custis, who was two decades her senior, on May 15, 1750. After they were married, Custis moved with her husband to his residence at White House Plantation on the Pamunkey River. Here they had four children: Daniel, born 1751; Frances, born 1753; John, born 1754; and Martha, born 1756. Daniel died in 1754 and Frances died in 1757. While her father had owned 15 to 20 slaves, her husband owned nearly 300, making him one of the largest slaveowners and wealthiest men in the Virginia colony.

Custis became a widow at the age of 26 when her husband died of heart failure. Upon his death, she inherited the large estate that he had previously inherited from his father. After his death in 1757, she received one third of his estate outright, and the remaining two thirds were granted to their two young children. The total inheritance amounted to approximately $33,000, 17,000 acres of land, and hundreds of slaves. The legal and financial matters of the inheritance presented a considerable burden on Custis while she was raising her two surviving children and grieving the loss of her husband and her children as well as that of her father. She was also left with the responsibility of managing the farmland and overseeing the well-being of the slaves. According to her biographer, "she capably ran the five plantations left to her when her first husband died, bargaining with London merchants for the best tobacco prices".

Marriage to George Washington

Courtship and wedding 

Custis, age 27, and Washington, age 26, married on January 6, 1759, at the White House plantation. As a man who lived and owned property in the area, Washington likely knew both Martha and Daniel Parke Custis for some time before Daniel's death. By one account, Washington visited Martha Custis twice at the White House plantation in March 1758; the second time, he came away with either an engagement of marriage or at least her promise to think about his proposal. By another, they were introduced by Colonel Chamberlayne, a mutual acquaintance, when they both stayed the night at his home in May 1758. At the time, she was also being courted by planter Charles Carter, who was even wealthier than Washington.

The couple honeymooned at the Custis family's White House plantation for several weeks, followed by a stay in Williamsburg where her husband was a representative, before setting up house at his Mount Vernon estate. At the time of their wedding, she was one of the wealthiest widows in the Thirteen Colonies. Their marriage remained happy over the following 40 years, in part because of their similar worldviews. It was a marriage based in mutual respect and shared habits, with both maintaining similar schedules in day-to-day life and both prioritizing family and image over excitement and vice.

Mount Vernon 
From 1759 to 1775, the Washingtons lived at Mount Vernon where they tended to their plantation. Washington ran the household and regularly entertained visitors. She knitted and oversaw the making of clothes, and she became talented in curing meat in their smokehouse. Washington entertained almost daily, having visitors for dinner or for longer stays as the family became more prominent in the political and social life of Virginia. Washington's husband used her wealth to buy additional land and slaves; he more than tripled the size of Mount Vernon ( in 1757;  in 1787). For more than 40 years, her "dower" slaves farmed the plantation alongside her husband's. By law, neither of the Washingtons could sell Custis lands or slaves, which Martha's dower and the trust owned.

The Washingtons had no children together, but they raised Martha's two surviving children. She was highly protective of them, especially after her two previous children had died and Patsy was found to have epilepsy. In 1773, Patsy died when she was 17 during an epileptic seizure. Washington's last surviving child, John, left King's College that fall and married Eleanor Calvert in February 1774. The Washingtons hoped for more children throughout their marriage, but they were unable to conceive.

American Revolution

Early revolution 

Life for the Washingtons was interrupted as the American Revolution escalated in the 1770s. Though rumors were spread that she was a Loyalist, Washington consistently shared her husband's political beliefs. She strongly supported her husband's role in the Patriot movement and his work to advance his beliefs in the cause. She stayed at Mount Vernon when he was appointed commander-in-chief of the Continental Army in 1775, overseeing the construction of new wings to their home. She then moved to the home of her brother-in-law so as not to be so conspicuous of a target during the American Revolutionary War.

The revolution was the first time in their marriage that they were apart for an extended period. In the fall of 1775, Washington traveled to Massachusetts to meet with her husband. On the journey north, she experienced her newfound celebrity status for the first time as the wife of a famed general. She joined him in Cambridge, from where he and the other Continental Army officers were operating. While staying in Cambridge, she served as a hostess for guests of the officers. She would also sew clothes for the soldiers while at camp, encouraging other officers' wives to do the same, leading to the creation of a sewing circle that contributed to the war effort. Though she hid it from those around her, Washington was frightened by the gunfire that could be heard from the nearby Siege of Boston. She accompanied her husband when operations were relocated to New York, but she was sent to Philadelphia as British forces came closer.

Independent United States 
The American Revolution became increasingly stressful for her after the signing of the Declaration of Independence, as the risks he faced on the battlefield increased. Each winter, Washington would join her husband at his encampment while fighting was stalled, improving morale for the soldiers and for her husband personally. The quality of her housing varied during these visits, both in comfort and in safety. General Lafayette observed that she loved "her husband madly". Washington was kept informed of the war's developments by her husband, sometimes performing clerical work for him, and she was even permitted to know military secrets. Each spring, when conflict resumed, she returned to Mount Vernon. She became a symbol of the war effort alongside her husband as a grandmotherly figure that cared for the soldiers.

The Continental Army settled in Valley Forge, the third of the eight winter encampments of the Revolution, on December 19, 1777. Washington traveled 10 days and hundreds of miles to join her husband in Pennsylvania. On April 6, Elizabeth Drinker and three friends arrived at Valley Forge to plead with the General to release their husbands from jail; the men, all Quakers, had refused to swear a loyalty oath to the American revolutionaries. Because the commander was not available at first, the women visited with Martha. Drinker described her later in her diary as "a sociable pretty kind of Woman."

The Washingtons' son John was serving as a civilian aide to his father during the siege of Yorktown in 1781 when he died of "camp fever", a contemporary diagnosis for epidemic typhus. After his death, the Washingtons adopted the youngest two of his four children, Eleanor (Nelly) Parke Custis and George Washington Parke (Washy) Custis. The Washingtons also provided personal and financial support to the children of many of their relatives and friends.

Postwar retirement 
The Washingtons returned to Mount Vernon in 1783. They stayed at Mount Vernon for much of the Confederation period, living in retirement with their nephew, nieces, and grandchildren. Washington, now in poorer health, believed that her husband was finished with public service. She spent her time raising their grandchildren, constantly worried for their health after having all four of her children and many other relatives die of illness. She also resumed hosting company at Mount Vernon, recruiting several of her nieces and other young women to assist her, as the house was overwhelmed with visitors. Their life at Mount Vernon was interrupted again when he was asked to participate at the Constitutional Convention in 1787 and again when he was chosen as the first president of the United States in 1789.

First lady of the United States

After the war, Washington was not fully supportive of her husband's agreeing to be president of the newly formed United States. She did not immediately join him at the capital in New York City, only arriving in May 1789. The journey was followed by the press, which was unprecedented in the attention that it paid to a woman's actions, and the entourage was met with admirers and fanfare in each town that it passed through. It was during this journey that she gave her only public speech as first lady, thanking those that came to see her. She arrived on the presidential barge, escorted by her husband, immediately establishing the president's wife as a public figure. After arriving at the capital, Washington became the inaugural first lady of the United States, though the term would not be used until later. Instead, she was referred to as "Lady Washington".

As the inaugural first lady, many of Washington's practices in the White House became traditions for future first ladies, including the opening of the White House to the public on New Year's Day, a practice that would continue until the Hoover administration. She hosted many affairs of state at New York City and Philadelphia during their years as temporary capitals. The social circles that developed among those in American politics became known as the Republican Court. Taking her responsibility as the lady of the house seriously, Washington returned the calls of every lady that left her card at the heavily-trafficked presidential home, always doing so within three days.

Washington was also tasked by her husband with the responsibility of hosting drawing room events on Fridays in which ladies were permitted to attend. She would remain seated during such events while the president greeted their guests. The guests were at first uncertain as to whether they should follow the royal custom of waiting for the hostess to leave before they do, and she resolved the issue by announcing her husband always retired at nine. She was careful during these events to avoid political talk, encouraging a change of subject when it came up.

Personal life 

The first presidential residence was a house on Cherry Street, followed by a house on Broadway. The capital was moved to Philadelphia in 1790, and the presidential residence again moved, this time to a house on Market Street. Washington much preferred the Philadelphia residence, as it had a greater social life and was closer to Mount Vernon. The Washingtons' self-imposed limits on social activity were accordingly loosened. While serving as first lady, Washington became close to Polly Lear, the wife of her husband's secretary Tobias Lear. She also associated with Lucy Flucker Knox, wife of war secretary Henry Knox, and Abigail Adams, the second lady. The time she spent with her grandchildren was another high point for Washington, who would sometimes take them to shows and museums. Being a devout Episcopalian, she also attended church regularly.

Washington was forced to take control of the presidential residence at one point shortly after her husband's presidency began, forbidding guests from entering, as he was undergoing the removal of a tumor. In July 1790, artist John Trumbull gave Washington a full-length portrait painting of her husband as a gift. It was displayed in their home at Mount Vernon in the New Room. When Washington learned that her husband may take on a second term as president, she uncharacteristically protested against the decision. Despite her opposition, he was reelected in 1793, and she reluctantly accepted four more years as the wife of the president. The young Georges Washington de La Fayette joined the Washington family in 1795 while his father, Marquis de Lafayette, was held as a political prisoner in France. He would live with the Washingtons until fall of 1797. In 1796, Washington's slave and personal maid Oney Judge escaped and fled to New Hampshire. Despite Washington's insistence, the president did not attempt to pursue Judge. Washington's tenure as first lady ended in 1797.

Public image 
As the wife of both the head of government and the head of state, Washington was immediately faced with the pressure of representing the United States. She had to present the United States as a dignified nation to establish credibility among the countries of Europe, but she also had to respect the spirit of democracy by refusing to present herself as a queen. She was also aware that the precedent she set would be inherited by future presidential wives. Washington balanced these responsibilities by playing the role of a social hostess at presidential events, a role that would become the primary function of the first lady. In turn, this made the position of first lady an important point of contact between the president and the people.

Washington presented an image of herself as an amiable wife, but privately she complained about the restrictions placed on her life. She found the pageantry of the presidency to be boring and artificial. At the same time, she had little opportunity to go out, as any action she took would have political implications and the Washingtons had declined to participate in private events. Washington was not exempt to the political attacks often levied at her husband's administration by opposition-owned newspapers. While her social role was celebrated by her husband's supporters, the anti-Federalists criticized her as emulating royalty and encouraging aristocracy. At the same time, other critics accused her social activities of being too informal. To her displeasure, she found that she was constantly the subject of public attention, and she was forced to pay increased attention to her hair and clothes each day. Despite this, she still opted to dress simply in homespun clothes, feeling that it was more appropriate in a republic.

Later life and death

The Washingtons left the capital immediately after the inauguration of John Adams, making the return journey to Mount Vernon, which by then had begun to decay. Again they went into retirement, and they saw to several renovations for their home. In the years after the presidency, the Washingtons received more visitors than ever, from friends and strangers alike. They eventually took in one of the former president's nephews, Lawrence Lewis, to serve as secretary, and he would eventually marry Washington's granddaughter Nelly.

Washington feared that her husband would again be called away to lead a provisional army against France, but no such conflict took place. Her husband died on December 14, 1799. As a widow, Washington spent her final years living in a garret where she knitted, sewed, and responded to letters. Though she was the legal owner of her husband's property, she gave control of its business affairs to her relatives. In December 1800, she signed a deed of manumission for her deceased husband's slaves. The slaves received their freedom on January 1, 1801, a little over a year after George's death.

Washington retained an interest in the presidency after her tenure as first lady, beginning the tradition of advising her successors. The Washington family long disliked Thomas Jefferson and Jeffersonian politics, in part because of the central role he played in criticizing the Washington administration. Washington took offense when he became president, feeling that he did not give adequate respect to the office. 

Washington's health, always somewhat precarious, declined after her husband's death. She had anticipated her death since that of her husband. When she developed a fever in 1802, she burned all of her husband's letters to her, summoned a clergyman to administer last communion, and chose her funeral dress. Two and a half years after the death of her husband, Washington died on May 22, 1802, at the age of 70. Following her death, Washington's body was interred in the original Washington family tomb vault at Mount Vernon. In 1831, the surviving executors of George's estate removed the bodies of the Washingtons from the old vault to a similar structure within the present enclosure at Mount Vernon.

Legacy 
Just as her husband had set the precedent for the presidency, Washington established what would eventually become the role of first lady. She was prominent in the ceremonial aspects of the presidency, assisting her husband in his role as head of state, but she had very little public involvement in his administrative role as head of government. This would be the standard of presidential wives for the next century. Washington was recognized for her humility and her mild-mannered nature, to the point that her contemporaries were often taken by surprise when meeting her. No personal records of Washington exist from before the death of her first husband, and she destroyed many letters that she had written since then. Many recipients of her letters kept them, however, and those letters have been preserved in archives and published in several collections.

Honors 
During the Revolutionary War, one of the regiments at Valley Forge named themselves "Lady Washington's Dragoon" in her honor.The Martha Washington College for Women was founded in Abingdon, Virginia in 1860. It was merged with Emory & Henry College in 1918, and the main original building of Martha Washington College is now operated as the Martha Washington Inn. Martha Washington Seminary, a finishing school for young women in Washington, DC, was also named in Washington's honor in 1905 until it ceased operations in 1949.

The first U.S. postage stamp honoring an American woman honored Martha Washington, and was issued as part of the 1902 stamp series. An  stamp, it was printed in violet-black ink. The second stamp issued in her honor, a  definitive stamp printed in orange-brown ink, was released in 1923. The third stamp to honor Washington was issued in 1938, as part of the Presidential Issue series. A  stamp, it was printed in yellow-brown ink. Washington's image was featured on the one dollar silver certificate banknote beginning in 1886, making her the second woman to appear on an American banknote after Pocahontas. To prevent confusion with existing coinage, pattern coins testing new metals have been produced by the U.S. mint, or a company contracted to it, with Martha Washington on the obverse.

Historian assessments 
Since 1982 Siena College Research Institute has periodically conducted surveys asking historians to assess American first ladies according to a cumulative score on the independent criteria of their background, value to the country, intelligence, courage, accomplishments, integrity, leadership, being their own women, public image, and value to the president. Consistently, Washington has been ranked in the upper-half of first ladies by historians in these surveys. In terms of cumulative assessment, Washington has been ranked:
9th-best of 42 in 1982
12th-best of 37 in 1993
13th-best of 38 in 2003
9th-best of 38 in 2008
9th-best of 39 in 2014

In the 2008 Siena Research Institute survey, Washington was ranked 3rd-highest in the criteria of public image. In the 2014 survey, Washington and her husband were ranked the 2nd-highest out of 39 first couples in terms of being a "power couple".

See also

References

Further reading

External links

 Martha Washington letters. A collaborative project of George Washington's Mount Vernon and the Center for History and New Media.
 Martha Washington at the White House (biography)
 Martha Washington at the National First Ladies Library (biography)
 Martha Washington (George Washington's Mount Vernon)
Martha Washington at C-SPAN's First Ladies: Influence & Image

1731 births
1802 deaths
18th-century American Episcopalians
19th-century American Episcopalians
18th-century American women
19th-century American women
American people of English descent
American people of Welsh descent
American planters
American salon-holders
American women slave owners
Burials at Mount Vernon
Colonial American women
Custis family of Virginia
Dandridge family of Virginia
First ladies of the United States
People from Mount Vernon, Virginia
People from New Kent County, Virginia
Spouses of Virginia politicians
Martha Dandridge
British North American Anglicans
Women in the American Revolution
18th-century American landowners
American women landowners